The School of Government and Public Administration is a four-year public high school in Paterson in Passaic County, New Jersey, United States, operated as part of the Paterson Public Schools. It is one of a number of academy programs serving students in ninth through twelfth grades based at the Eastside High School campus.

As of the 2020–21 school year, the school had an enrollment of 695 students and 48.0 classroom teachers (on an FTE basis), for a student–teacher ratio of 14.5:1. There were 379 students (54.5% of enrollment) eligible for free lunch and none eligible for reduced-cost lunch.

Awards, recognition and rankings
The school was the 315th-ranked public high school in New Jersey out of 339 schools statewide in New Jersey Monthly magazine's September 2014 cover story on the state's "Top Public High Schools", using a new ranking methodology, after being ranked 305th in the state in 2012.

Administration
The school's principal is Andre McCollum Sr. His administration team includes the vice principal.

References

External links 
School website
Paterson Public Schools

School Data for the Paterson Public Schools, National Center for Education Statistics

Education in Paterson, New Jersey
Public high schools in Passaic County, New Jersey